Futase Dam is an arch gravity dam located in Saitama prefecture in Japan. The dam was constructed to control floods and to generate hydro-electricity. The catchment area of the dam is 170 km2. The dam impounds about 76 ha of land when full and can store 26.9 million cubic meters of water. The construction of the dam was started on 1952 and completed in 1961.

In 2003 a sediment removal program was started to remove 100,000m3 of sediment that was deposited in the reservoir.

References

Dams in Saitama Prefecture
1961 establishments in Japan